Roe Vincent is a singer, composer and vocal arranger. She has worked with the Indian music industry's best music directors such as A. R. Rahman, Harris Jayaraj, D. Imman, Vijay Antony, Srinivas, Anirudh Ravichander, S. J. Surya and Joshua Sridhar. Her hit songs include "Adiye" from the movie Kadal and "Hey" from the movie Vanakkam Chennai. Her vocal arrangements have been featured in block buster movies such as Kadal, Mariyan, Highway, Million Dollar Arm, Yaamirukka Bayamey and many more. Her work has called her to arrange and produce for various TV shows such as Vijay TV's Airtel Super Singer in Chennai and Mazhavil Manorama's Josco Indian Voice in Kerala and Superstar in Astro TV, Malaysia. She conducts a choral vocal group named El Fé, is the lead singer of her band Overtone and performs in various shows and concerts with them.

Early life and family background
Maria Roshni Vincent was born in Chennai. Her father is Mr. Leo Vincent, an Engineer and her mother is Mrs. Anita Vincent. She has a younger sister Maryaan Ranjini Vincent who is a Graphic Designer. She is the only professional musician in her family.
She was educated at Good Shepherd Matriculation Higher Secondary School. She is a B.Sc. zoology graduate from Stella Maris College. She also holds a bachelor's degree in English from Madras University.
She has completed her bachelor's degree in music from the International College of Music (ICOM) in Kuala Lumpur and the Berklee College of Music in Boston and has her 8th grade in piano from the Trinity College, London. She plays the piano and guitar.

Career
She was introduced by music director D. Imman in the movie Kacheri Arambam. She had sung the song "Kadavule" in the movie.
She worked as a Western Contemporary Instructor at A. R. Rahman’s KM College of Music. While she was working there A. R. Rahman spotted her and gave her an opportunity to sing in "Adiye" in the movie Kadal. Since then, she has sung and arranged vocals in several movies' songs and background scores such as Linga, Maryaan, Kochadhayan, Yaamirukka Bayamey, Million Dollar Arm, Monkeys of Mumbai, Moonu, Anegan, Maan Karate, Vanakkam Chennai, Amen, GodFather, Ek deewana Tha, Highway etc. Her debut single "Neethan Yen Dream Girl" was released on YouTube.

El FÉ Choir
She started the "El FÉ Choir" four years ago. They have been featured in many movies. The choir is owned and directed by her.
The choir's movie credits include the following: 
 3(Moonu)
 Maan Karate
 Sigaram Thodu 
 Jeeva
 Million Dollar Arm
 Yaamirukka Bayamey
 Anegan
 Romeo Juliet
 Maryan – BGM
 Valiyavan
 Kanchana 2
 Ai
 Lingaa
 Singam 3
 Yaman
 Monsoon Mangoes
 Million Dollar Arm
 Kaaki Sattai
 Sigaram Thodu
 Naanum Rowdy Dhaan
 Thani Oruvan
 24

The Choir has done a Christmas Single titled "Oh Holy Night" which was released recently.

Discography

Tamil

Hindi

Kannada

BGM’s

 Neethan Yen Dream Girl – Debut as a Composer

Concerts and performances 
 She has performed in A. R. Rahman’s concert "Thai Mannae Vanakkam".
 She has worked for Vijay TV’s Airtel Super Singer in 2011. She has also sung for the show.
 She has performed with Music Director Anoop in Hyderabad.
 She has also worked in Gospel Music with Gospel Singers like Gersson Edinbaro and Daniel Jawahar.

References

External links
 Follow Maria Roe Vincent in Twitter
 Like & Follow Maria Roe Vincent's Official Page in Facebook
 Subscribe to Maria Roe Vincent in YouTube

Living people
Tamil playback singers
Kannada playback singers
1989 births
Indian women playback singers
Singers from Chennai
Women musicians from Tamil Nadu
21st-century Indian singers
21st-century Indian women singers